The 2018 Motocross des Nations was a motocross race held on 6 October and 7 October 2018. The event was held at the Red Bud circuit, in Michigan, United States. Motocross des Nations was last held in United States in 2010 but never at this venue.

France went into the event as the defending champions after taking their fifth title in 2017 and successfully defended their title.

Entry List 
Start numbers are allocated based on the team finish from the previous year's edition. France are the reigning champions so they start with numbers 1, 2 and 3.

Practice 
Practice is run on a class by class basis.

MXGP

MX2

Open

Qualifying Races 
Qualifying is run on a class by class basis.
Top 19 countries after qualifying go directly to the main Motocross des Nations races. The remaining countries go to a smaller final.
Best 2 scores count.

MXGP

MX2

Open

Qualification Standings 

 Qualified Nations

 Nations Admitted to the B-Final

B-Final 
The B-Final is for the nations who finished 20th-31st in qualifying. The top nation from the B-Final qualify for the Motocross des Nations races.
Best 2 scores for each nation counts.

Race

B-Final Standings 

 Puerto Rico qualify for the Motocross des Nations races.

Motocross des Nations races 
The main Motocross des Nations races consist of 3 races which combine two classes together in each. Lowest score wins with each nation allowed to drop their worst score after the final race.

MXGP+MX2 

 Killian Auberson was injured during the MX2 qualifying race.

Nations standings after Race 1

MX2+Open

Nations standings after Race 2

MXGP+Open

Nations standings after Race 3

Final standings 

Following the event, Italy were disqualified from second place overall due to failing fuel tests.

References

External links
Motocross of  Nations at fim-live.com

2018
2018 in motorcycle sport
October 2018 sports events in the United States